Anna Alexandrovna Kuzmenko (born 27 February 2004) is a Russian-born figure skater who competes for France. She is the 2019 French junior national champion and represented the country at the 2019 World Junior Championships, advancing to the free skate and finishing 15th overall.

Career

2018–2019 season
In the 2018–2019 season, she debuted in the ISU Junior Grand Prix series.

At the 2019 French Championships, Kuzmenko won the junior gold medal.

In March 2019, she represented France at the 2019 World Junior Championships in Zagreb, Croatia. Ranked 7th in the short, she vaulted into the penultimate (second-to-last) group for the free skate, where she placed only 18th, falling to 15th overall.

Programs

Competitive highlights

For France 
JGP: Junior Grand Prix

Detailed results

Junior level

References

External links 

 

2004 births
Russian female single skaters
French female single skaters
Living people
Figure skaters from Moscow
Figure skaters from Paris